Alberto Piazza (born Turin, 18 October 1941) is an Italian human geneticist, Professor of Human Genetics at the University of Turin.

Biography
Born into a Jewish family in Turin, professor of Medical statistics at the University of Turin, professor of Genetics at the University of Naples, and professor of Human Genetics at the University of Turin.

Works
 (with Luigi Luca Cavalli-Sforza and Paolo Menozzi) The history and geography of human genes, Princeton University Press, 1994.

References

External links
 Human Genetics Foundation webpage

1941 births
Living people
Italian geneticists
20th-century Italian Jews